Casasola is a municipality of Spain in Ávila, autonomous community Castile and León.

Area and Population
It has a surface area of 18.36 km2, a population of 124, and a population density of 6.75 people per km2.

Municipalities in the Province of Ávila